Ljiljana Čolić (born 1956) is a Serbian politician who previously served as Minister for Education and Sport in the Government of Serbia.

Academic career
Čolić holds a graduate degree in philosophy and a Ph.D. in philology. She is a professor of Ottoman language and paleography at the University of Belgrade as well as an associate professor teaching Turkish at the University of Belgrade Faculty of Philology; and in Priština, she worked as a guest lecturer at the Faculty of Philosophy. She is a self-avowed "devout Orthodox Christian".

Čolić was a deputy in the Federal Parliament and one of the founders of the Democratic Party of Serbia. She speaks English and French fluently.

Political life
Čolić was named Minister of Education and Sport in March 2004. As a conservative government superseded a reformist one, Dr. Čolić worked to alter and reverse changes from the previous government.

Čolić garnered controversy in September 2004 when she ordered Serbian schools to suspend the teaching of evolution unless they introduced creationism.

Researchers, teachers, the Serbian Academy of Science and Arts and some 40 non-government organisations and human rights groups voiced their concern over such a move, including UNICEF. After widespread protest, on September 9, Prime Minister Vojislav Koštunica reversed the decision and announced that Čolić would be replaced.

On September 16, 2004, she resigned after a meeting with Koštunica. Slobodan Vuksanović replaced her in October 2004.

In June 2006 she published a book titled Put (path), staunchly defending her actions as a minister of education. During the official promotion of her book, she claimed that during her tenure, when she asked foreign advisors why they pushed so hard for the reform of Serbian education, she was told that they need plumbers, not educated people.

In an interview in November 2019, professor Milan M. Ćirković discussed pseudoscience. He mentioned Čolić's short ministerial stint, adding that because of her removal of Darwinism, she was "depicted as a heroine in the magazines and books of the global creationist movement". Čolić responded with a letter, underlining Ćirković's claim that some pseudoscience are life threatening, though he specifically used it for other movements like pseudo-medicine, quackery and antivaxers. Čolić wrote: "difference between us - adherents of the "life threatening pseudoscience", and them - serious scientists, is that we accept that incomprehensible is indeed incomprehensible, unlike them who claim that incomprehensible is comprehensible. They unlimitedly believe in limited science, and we believe in super-science - impervious to the limited human mind. As for the two 8th grade biology lessons in elementary school which I "plucked" from Darwin's ape, I added them to the previous lesson: Family and health - healthy family. Role of the family. Delinquency. Restraining and treatment of addiction illnesses."

References

External links
Interpress Service News Agency

1956 births
Living people
People from Zemun
Politicians from Belgrade
Academic staff of the University of Belgrade
University of Belgrade Faculty of Philology alumni
Democratic Party of Serbia politicians
Government ministers of Serbia
Women government ministers of Serbia
21st-century Serbian women politicians
21st-century Serbian politicians
Creationists
Education ministers of Serbia